Mawlawi Muhammad Hussain also known as Jamil al-Rahman al-Afghani (1939–30 August 1991) was the founder and leader of Jamaat al-Dawah ila al-Quran wal-Sunnah, a Salafist organisation located in Kunar Province of Afghanistan. He was also the Emir of the short-lived Islamic Emirate of Kunar.

Early life

Born in 1939 at Ningalam in the Pech valley, Kunar Province, he was a member of the Safi Pashtun tribe, and was educated at the Panjpir madrasah, a Salafi institution financed by Saudi Arabia.

Role in the mujahideen insurgency

During the 1970s, he joined the Islamist Muslim Youth movement led by Gulbuddin Hekmatyar. In 1978, as a member of Hekmatyar's Hezbi Islami, he journeyed between Kunar and Pakistan, organizing attacks against the Khalq regime, including the killing of a Khalqi schoolteacher. In 1979, after the insurgency had taken hold in Kunar, Jamil al-Rahman became the amir of Hezbi Islami in that province. In order to gain control of the insurgency, he worked to undermine independent mujahideen fronts. In the summer of 1979, he played a controversial role in the mutiny of Afghan Army troops at Asmar, with most of the parties involved blaming him for the failure of the uprising. The soldiers, who had intended to join the mujahideen, eventually dispersed, and their weapons were sold by Hezbi Islami in Pakistan.

Establishment of Jamaat al Dawa al Quran

In 1985 (or 1986–1987, depending on sources) he established his own movement known as the Jama'at al Da'wa ila al Qur'an wa-Sunna. This group, theologically close to the Jamiat Ahle Hadith, was known for its harsh treatment of civilians in government-controlled areas. Due to his personal background and the proximity of the Bajaur Agency where many Arab militants were active, Jamil al-Rahman was able to secure funding from Saudi Arabia (reportedly from King Fahd himself) and Kuwait, allowing him to operate independently. Many Arab volunteers, in particular Egyptians, joined his movement. They later established the Islamic Emirate of Kunar, before being overthrown by Gulbuddin Hekmatyar.

Death

On August 30, 1991, a young Egyptian journalist named Abdullah Rumi affiliated with the Muslim Brotherhood came to al-Rahman’s home in Bajaur. Al-Rahman’s guards, believing he was part of the Arab-led peace council, did not search him. The young journalist went to al-Rahman’s side where he was seated, as though to ask him a question. He then drew a pistol and shot him three times. Rumi immediately committed suicide without explaining his act. Al-Rahman cried out “Allah is the greatest!” and fell dead.

Aftermath of the Death 

Al-Rahman’s death shocked the Saudi royal family, Grand Mufti Bin Baz, and the broader Saudi religious establishment. In spite of his many enemies, al-Rahman’s murder reverberated throughout the Salafi mujahideen community, and his death and the subsequent dissolution of the Islamic Emirate of Kunar was major topic of discussion in Salafi mujahideen communities for years to come. Not long after al-Rahman’s assassination, the state that he founded disappeared.

See also
Former Salafist states in Afghanistan

References

People of the Soviet–Afghan War
Afghan warlords
Afghan Sunni Muslims
Afghan Salafis
History of Kunar Province
People from Kunar Province
Salafist states in Afghanistan
1939 births
1991 deaths
Deaths by firearm in Pakistan
Ahl-i Hadith people

External links